Dragonblade, Dragon-Blade, Dragon Blade, or variants thereof, may refer to:

Film
 DragonBlade: The Legend of Lang, a 2005 Hong Kong animated film
 Dragon Blade (film), a 2015 Chinese film starring Jackie Chan

Literature
 Dragon Blade: The Book of the Rowan, a 2005 Oak, Yew, Ash, Rowan novel by Sasha Miller and Andre Norton
 Dragonblade (Age of Fire), the name of two fictional characters

Other
 Dragon Blade: Wrath of Fire, a 2007 video game
 Task Force Dragon Blade, a military unit

See also
 Dark Dragon Blade, an item from the video game franchise Ninja Gaiden
 Naruto Shippuden: Dragon Blade Chronicles (2009 video game), Wii game
 Green Dragon Crescent Blade, Guan Yu's guandao sword from Romance of the Three Kingdoms also called the "Holy Dragon Blade"